The Key Holiday is a key holiday originated from China, and is celebrated in multiple East Asian countries, including China and Korea.

China 
The Double Third Festival or Shangsi Festival is a Chinese festival celebrated on the third day of the third month of the Chinese calendar.

It is said that the origin of this festival comes from the Dinner Party at the Qushui River during the Zhou Dynasty (about 1100-221 BC). Others say its origins come from the ceremonial custom of getting rid of evils by bathing in the river. On this day, people would hold a sacrificing ceremony on a riverside to honor their ancestors, and then take a bath in the river with herbs to cleanse their bodies of filth. Following that, young men and women would then go for a spring outing in which many of these scenes were described in Shi Jing (The Book of Songs).

The Shangsi Festival activities have changed with through the different dynasties. The entertainment feast and praying for descendants along the riverside were added in the Han Dynasty (206 BC-220 AD). It was after the Wei and Jin dynasties (220-420 AD) that the festival developed into the Double-Third (Shangsi) Festival that is fixed on the third day of the third lunar month.

In modern times, to observe this festival, people would go for an outing by the water, have picnics, and pluck orchids.  It is also a day for invoking cleansing rituals to prevent disease and get rid of bad luck. The day is also traditionally considered to be a possible birthday of the Yellow Emperor.

The ancient traditions of Shangsi are mostly celebrated by several communities spread out among the provinces today, such as the ancient village of Xinye which holds elaborate ancestor worship ceremonies on this day.

The great calligrapher Wang Xizhi mentions this festival in his famous work Preface to the Orchid Pavilion Poems, written in regard to the Orchid Pavilion Gathering during the Six Dynasties era.

Japan 

In Japan, the Double Third festival is celebrated as Hinamatsuri.

Korea 
Samjinnal is one of sesi pungsok (세시풍속) or Korean traditional customs by season, which falls on the third day of the third month in the Chinese calendar. It was called samjil (삼질) in old Korean language and referred to as sangsa, wonsa (원사, 元巳), sungsam (중삼, 重三), sangje (상제, 上除) or dapcheongjeol (답청절, 踏靑節) in hanja. Samjinnal implies the overlapping of Sam (three). According to Choi Namseon, samjil was derived from the consonants of Samil, and Sangsa is defined as the first snake day of the 3rd lunar month.

Customs

During Samjinnal, people pick out azalea flowers and knead it with glutinous rice dough to make Hwajeon, a Korean traditional rice cake. Mung bean powder is used to make mung bean noodles, and is also occasionally used with the azalea flowers. By dyeing the mung bean powder with red water, a seasonal dish called Sumyeon can be prepared. Other than this, white bubble rice cakes made with red bean paste called Santteok, Goritteok made from glutinous rice, pine endodermis and mugwort, and Ssuktteok made from glutinous rice and mugwort leaves are eaten this day.

Nori (Folk games)
Pulssaum (풀싸움)
Pulgaksi noleum (풀각시놀음)
Fortunetelling
Hwajeon nori (화전놀이, 花煎--) - It literally means "flower pancake play".

See also
Dragon Boat Festival
Mid-autumn Festival
Lantern Festival 
Qingming Festival
Chuseok
Dano

References

Citations

Bibliography

Festivals in China
Festivals in Hong Kong
Festivals in Japan
Festivals in Korea
Festivals in Taiwan
March observances
April observances
Observances set by the Chinese calendar
Observances set by the Korean calendar
Public holidays in China
Public holidays in Hong Kong
Public holidays in Taiwan